Turok is a surname. Notable people with the surname include:

 Ben Turok (1927–2019), South African anti-apartheid activist
 Marta Turok (born 1952), Mexican anthropologist
 Neil Turok (born 1958), South African physicist

See also